Le Vigan is a commune in the Gard department in southern France. It is a sub-prefecture of the department.

Geography

Le Vigan is located at the south of the Massif Central and near the Mont Aigoual, in the Arre valley. The town is on the southern edge of the Cévennes National Park and is the most populous town within the park.

Climate

Le Vigan has a hot-summer Mediterranean climate (Köppen climate classification Csa).

History

On a river at the southern edge of the Massif Central, Le Vigan is situated on a natural boundaryline. In the 2nd-3rd centuries BCE, it was situated between the territories occupied by the Volcae Arecomici, the Averni, and the Gabali tribes. In 121 BCE the Romans gained control of much of southern France including the area around Le Vigan. The Volcae Arecomici voluntarily surrendered their territory, and the Arverni gave up much territory in a treaty that nevertheless preserve their independence. Under Roman control, Le Vigan was part of the Roman "Provincia," (hence Provence) called Gallia Narbonensis.

The Visigoths took control of the western half of Gallia Narbonensis in 462 CE, a part known as Septimania which included Le Vigan, and they retained control despite attempts in 586 and 589 by the Frankish (Merovingian) King Guntram to conquer the area from the north. In 587 the region came under Catholic rule with the conversion of the Visigoth king Reccared I. In 719, the Moor Al-Samh conquered Septimania and the Franks struggled to take it back over the next several decades. By 780, Charlemagne had conquered the entire territory.
Le Vigan is on the site of an ancient Roman town which may be "Vindomagus", but it is not certain. There is a spring called "la source d'Isis," which has provided water to the city since at least 1069 and which was named in honor of the Roman goddess. The town was destroyed during the Moorish invasion of Provence.

Population

Economy
As with many towns in the Cévennes, there were many textile industries there in the past.  Several quarries south of town above Montdardier were formerly important sources of lithographic limestone.  Stone from these quarries earned an honorable mention in the Great Exhibition of 1851.

Le Vigan is a tourist destination during summer time.

Personalities
 Chevalier d'Assas (1733–1760) - A captain of the Régiment d'Auvergne famous for an account of his participation in the battle of Kloster Kampen during the Seven Years' War. He is often credited with sacrificing his life to alert his regiment to the presence of the English near their camp, with the phrase "To me, Auvergne! Here is the enemy!"
 Abraham Peyrenc de Moras (1684-1732) - Banker, born a commoner, rose to the nobility and died immensely wealthy. Built the Hôtel Biron in Paris which now houses the Musée Rodin. 
 Caroline Proust Actress (1967-)
  (1731–1824), Constituent
 Odette Teissier du Cros (1906-1997), founder and curator of Le Vigan's 
  (1771-1799) - soldier of the French Revolution

Sights
 The  shows the life in the Cévennes during the past centuries
 The Vieux Pont is an old bridge built during the 11th century
 The old hotel Faventines called Château d'Assas from 18th century
 The Arboretum de la Foux and Arboretum de l'Hort de Dieu are mature arboretums

See also
Communes of the Gard department

References

External links

 Patrimoine du Vigan

Communes of Gard
Subprefectures in France
Languedoc